The 69th parallel north is a circle of latitude that is 69 degrees north of the Earth's equatorial plane, in the Arctic. It crosses the Atlantic Ocean, Europe, Asia and North America, and passes through some of the southern seas of the Arctic Ocean.

At this latitude the Sun is visible for 24 hours, 0 minutes during the summer solstice and Civil Twilight during the winter solstice.

Around the world
Starting at the Prime Meridian and heading eastwards, the parallel 69° north passes through:

{| class="wikitable plainrowheaders"
! scope="col" width="125" | Co-ordinates
! scope="col" | Country, territory or sea
! scope="col" | Notes
|-
| style="background:#b0e0e6;" | 
! scope="row" style="background:#b0e0e6;" | Atlantic Ocean
| style="background:#b0e0e6;" | Norwegian Sea
|-
| 
! scope="row" | 
| Islands of Langøya, Andøya, Bjarkøya and Dyrøya, and the mainland Troms
|-
| 
! scope="row" | 
| Norrbotten County (Lapland province)Passing 6.7 km south of the tripoint between Finland, Norway and Sweden
|-
| 
! scope="row" | 
| Lapland
|-
| 
! scope="row" | 
| Troms og Finnmark
|-
| 
! scope="row" | 
| Lapland
|-
| 
! scope="row" | 
| | Kola Peninsula, Murmansk OblastPassing 5.8 km south of the tripoint between Finland, Norway and RussiaPassing northern parts of Murmansk
|-
| style="background:#b0e0e6;" | 
! scope="row" style="background:#b0e0e6;" | Arctic Ocean
| style="background:#b0e0e6;" | Barents Sea
|-
| 
! scope="row" | 
| Island of Kolguyev, Nenets Autonomous Okrug
|-
| style="background:#b0e0e6;" | 
! scope="row" style="background:#b0e0e6;" | Arctic Ocean
| style="background:#b0e0e6;" | Pechora Sea, Barents Sea
|-
| 
! scope="row" | 
| Yugorsky Peninsula, Nenets Autonomous OkrugYamalo-Nenets Autonomous Okrug
|-
| style="background:#b0e0e6;" | 
! scope="row" style="background:#b0e0e6;" | Arctic Ocean
| style="background:#b0e0e6;" | Baydaratskaya Bay, Kara Sea
|-
| 
! scope="row" | 
| Yamal Peninsula, Yamalo-Nenets Autonomous Okrug
|-
| style="background:#b0e0e6;" | 
! scope="row" style="background:#b0e0e6;" | Arctic Ocean
| style="background:#b0e0e6;" | Gulf of Ob, Kara Sea
|-
| style="background:#b0e0e6;" | 
! scope="row" style="background:#b0e0e6;" | Arctic Ocean
| style="background:#b0e0e6;" | Taz Estuary, Kara Sea
|-
| 
! scope="row" | 
| Yamalo-Nenets Autonomous OkrugKrasnoyarsk KraiYakutiaChukotka Autonomous Okrug
|-
| style="background:#b0e0e6;" | 
! scope="row" style="background:#b0e0e6;" | Arctic Ocean 
| style="background:#b0e0e6;" | Chaunskaya Bay, East Siberian Sea
|-
| 
! scope="row" | 
| Chukotka Autonomous Okrug
|-
| style="background:#b0e0e6;" | 
! scope="row" style="background:#b0e0e6;" | Arctic Ocean
| style="background:#b0e0e6;" | Chukchi Sea
|-
| 
! scope="row" | 
| Alaska
|-
| 
! scope="row" | 
| Yukon
|-
| style="background:#b0e0e6;" | 
! scope="row" style="background:#b0e0e6;" | Arctic Sea
| style="background:#b0e0e6;" | Mackenzie Bay, Beaufort Sea
|-
|-
| 
! scope="row" | 
| Mackenzie River delta and mainland Northwest TerritoriesNunavut
|-
| style="background:#b0e0e6;" | 
! scope="row" style="background:#b0e0e6;" | Arctic Sea
| style="background:#b0e0e6;" | Dolphin and Union Strait
|-
| 
! scope="row" | 
| (unnamed peninsula) Nunavut
|-
| style="background:#b0e0e6;" | 
! scope="row" style="background:#b0e0e6;" | Arctic Sea
| style="background:#b0e0e6;" | Dolphin and Union Strait
|-
| 
! scope="row" | 
| Victoria Island, Nunavut
|-
| style="background:#b0e0e6;" | 
! scope="row" style="background:#b0e0e6;" | Arctic Sea
| style="background:#b0e0e6;" | Dease Strait
|-
| 
! scope="row" | 
| Victoria Island (Canada)|Victoria Island, Nunavut
|-
| style="background:#b0e0e6;" | 
! scope="row" style="background:#b0e0e6;" | Arctic Sea
| style="background:#b0e0e6;" | Victoria Strait
|-
| 
! scope="row" | 
| Royal Geographical Society Islands, Nunavut
|-
| style="background:#b0e0e6;" | 
! scope="row" style="background:#b0e0e6;" | Arctic Sea
| style="background:#b0e0e6;" | Alexandra Strait
|-
| 
! scope="row" | 
| King William Island, Nunavut
|-
| style="background:#b0e0e6;" | 
! scope="row" style="background:#b0e0e6;" | Arctic Sea
| style="background:#b0e0e6;" | Rae Strait
|-
| 
! scope="row" | 
| (unnamed peninsula) Nunavut
|-
| style="background:#b0e0e6;" | 
! scope="row" style="background:#b0e0e6;" | Arctic Sea
| style="background:#b0e0e6;" | Pelly Bay, Gulf of Boothia
|-
| 
! scope="row" | 
| (unnamed islands) Nunavut
|-
| style="background:#b0e0e6;" | 
! scope="row" style="background:#b0e0e6;" | Arctic Sea
| style="background:#b0e0e6;" | Gulf of Boothia
|-
| 
! scope="row" | 
| Simpson Peninsula, Nunavut
|-
| style="background:#b0e0e6;" | 
! scope="row" style="background:#b0e0e6;" | Arctic Sea
| style="background:#b0e0e6;" | Committee Bay, Gulf of Boothia
|-
| 
! scope="row" | 
| Islands off coast and mainland Melville Peninsula, Nunavut
|-
| style="background:#b0e0e6;" | 
! scope="row" style="background:#b0e0e6;" | Arctic Sea
| style="background:#b0e0e6;" | Foxe Basin
|-
| 
! scope="row" | 
| Rowley Island, Nunavut
|-
| style="background:#b0e0e6;" | 
! scope="row" style="background:#b0e0e6;" | Arctic Sea
| style="background:#b0e0e6;" |  Foxe Basin
|-
| 
! scope="row" | 
| Baffin Island, Nunavut
|-
| style="background:#b0e0e6;" | 
! scope="row" style="background:#b0e0e6;" | Arctic Sea
| style="background:#b0e0e6;" | Davis Strait
|-
| 
! scope="row" | 
| AvannaataSermersooq
|-
|-
| style="background:#b0e0e6;" | 
! scope="row" style="background:#b0e0e6;" | Atlantic Ocean
| style="background:#b0e0e6;" | Greenland Sea Norwegian Sea
|-
|}

See also
68th parallel north
70th parallel north

n69
Geography of the Arctic